William or Bill Nicholls may refer to:
William Nicholls (theologian) (1664−1712), English clergyman and theologian
Sir William Nicholls (Royal Marines officer) (1854−1935), British Royal Marines general
William Henry Nicholls, Australian amateur botanist
Billy Nicholls (born 1949), British singer, songwriter, composer, record producer, and musical director
Bill Nicholls (Australian footballer) (born 1981), Australian rules footballer
Bill Nicholls (Vanuatuan footballer) (born 1993), Vanuatuan footballer
Will Nicholls (born 1995), British photographer and film-maker

See also
William Nichols (disambiguation)